The Armored train Hurban was an armored train used during World War II, during the Slovak National Uprising. The Hurban was constructed on September 25, 1944, in the Railway Manufactory in Zvolen, Slovakia, and was the last armored train used in the Slovak National Uprising. A replica is displayed as a monument in a park next to the castle in Zvolen, and an original preserved machine gun carriage is at the Museum of the Slovak National Uprising in Banská Bystrica.

Combat history 
The commander of the train was Captain J. Kukliš, and his assistant was Lt. J. Belko, together commanding a crew of 71 men.  Hurban operated in the Brezno – Červená Skala area against the 18th division SS Horst Wessel and from October 23–24, 1944, was the main factor in the fight for the upper flow of the Hron river. Despite suffering a damaged engine, it repulsed all German attacks. It was pulled to Harmanec, where it was abandoned in a railway tunnel, the crew fighting on as a partisan detachment.

See also 
 Armored train Štefánik
 Krajina Express

References

Slovak National Uprising
Armoured fighting vehicles of World War II
Armoured trains of Slovakia